General Sir Charles Redmond "Reddy" Watt,  (born 1950) is a retired senior British Army officer who was Commander-in-Chief, Land Command. Between 2011 - 2018, he was also the Governor of the Royal Hospital Chelsea.

Army career
Reddy Watt was educated at Eton College and Christ Church, Oxford and was commissioned into the Welsh Guards in 1972. He passed through the Staff College, Camberley in 1982, and also completed the Higher Command and Staff Course. Promoted to lieutenant colonel on 30 June 1988, he became commanding officer of the 1st Battalion, Welsh Guards in 1990. He was promoted to brigadier 30 June 1993 and served as commanding officer of the 3rd Infantry Brigade from 1994 to 1995, and was then appointed Director of Studies and Deputy Commandant (Land) of the Joint Service Command and Staff College in 1997. On 17 August 1998 he was promoted to major-general and became General Officer Commanding the 1st (UK) Armoured Division, which deployed to Bosnia as Headquarters Multi-National Division (South-West).

Watt became Major-General commanding the Household Division and General Officer Commanding London District in 2000, in which capacity he had a significant role in the funeral of the Queen Mother in 2002. In 2003 he became Commander Field Army. In 2005 he was appointed General Officer Commanding Northern Ireland: in this role he advocated long-term planning and indicated that such lessons might be applied to Iraq. From 2006 to 2008 he was Commander-in-Chief, Land Command.

Awards
He was made an Officer of the Order of the British Empire, then promoted to Commander in 1996. He was appointed a Knight Commander of the Royal Victorian Order in 2004 on relinquishing his appointment commanding the Household Division. He was appointed a Knight Commander of the Order of the Bath in 2008. He retired from the army in early 2008.

Later career
In retirement he has become President of the charity Combat Stress. In 2011 he also became Governor of the Royal Hospital Chelsea. He is a Deputy Lieutenant of Berkshire.

References

|-

|-

|-
 

|-
 

|-
 

|-
 

|-

1950 births
Living people
People educated at Eton College
Alumni of Christ Church, Oxford
British Army generals
Knights Commander of the Order of the Bath
Knights Commander of the Royal Victorian Order
Commanders of the Order of the British Empire
Deputy Lieutenants of Berkshire
Welsh Guards officers
Graduates of the Staff College, Camberley